The men's 10,000 metres at the 2012 European Athletics Championships was held at the Helsinki Olympic Stadium on 30 June.

Medalists

Records

Schedule

Results

Final

References

 Final Results
Full results

10000
10,000 metres at the European Athletics Championships
Marathons in Finland